Franklin Perkins Hall (December 13, 1938 – May 26, 2015) was an American politician. A Democrat, he was a member of the Virginia House of Delegates 1976–2009, serving as minority leader 2002–07.

On March 28, 2009 Hall announced that he would retire from the House effective April 14. Governor Tim Kaine appointed him to the Virginia Alcoholic Beverage Control Board as of the same date. He died on May 26, 2015. His wife, Phoebe Poulterer Hall, Richmond's first female public defender, later one of its first female judges and for many years rector of the Board of Visitors of Virginia Commonwealth University died in January 2019. They are survived by a son, daughter and several grandchildren and buried in Amelia County, Virginia

Notes

References

External links

1938 births
2015 deaths
Democratic Party members of the Virginia House of Delegates
Virginia lawyers
University of Lynchburg alumni
American University alumni
Politicians from Richmond, Virginia
People from Amelia, Virginia
20th-century American lawyers